GRAI can refer to
 Global Returnable Asset Identifier
 GRAI method